The Worthgate School (formerly CATS College Canterbury,  Stafford House College) is a coeducational Private day and boarding school located in Canterbury, England, catering primarily for foreign students. It is owned by the CATS Global Schools group. The school specialises in preparing students for pre-university exams such as A-Levels and the International Baccalaureate as well as providing additional English tuition.

The Worthgate School has been authorized to offer the IB Diploma Programme since April 2007; the programme is taught in English.

History

Established in 1952 by Harry Allsopp as Stafford House Tutorial College. It started out in the London location of Kensington, but later was moved to Canterbury.  After Harry Allsopp's death in 1959, his wife Joyce Allsopp ran the college until she retired 1992.  Stafford House Tutorial College as it was then known was a founding member of "CIFE – the Council for Independent Education." It was the first school in the UK to offer University Foundation programmes for students wanting to go to university from overseas.

In 2010 it was voted LTM High School of the Year (See LTM website - past award winners)

The college became a member of the Independent Schools Association in 2010. The college was inspected in 2011 with no areas of the college rated below 'Good' by the Independent Schools Inspectorate. Boarding at the college was rated as 'Excellent' and leadership was described as 'Outstanding'. (See Independent Schools Inspectorate - ISI.net)

In 2016 the college was inspected with no areas of the college rated below 'excellent' by the Independent Schools Inspectorate. The quality of the pupils achievements and learning was excellent, the contribution of curricular and extra-curricular provision was excellent, the contribution of teaching was excellent, the spiritual, moral, social and cultural development of the pupils was excellent, the contribution of arrangements for pastoral care was excellent, the contribution of the arrangements for welfare, health and safety was excellent, the overall quality of boarding was excellent, the quality of governance was excellent and the quality of leadership and management, including links with parents, carers and guardians was excellent.

In 2012 and 2014 the college won awards from the Independent Schools Association (See ISA website). In 2014 it won the Independent Schools Award from the Times Educational Supplement for Best Boarding Initiative and was shortlisted for Independent School of the Year (See TES online)

The school was renamed from CATS Canterbury to The Worthgate School in October 2022 with a new gold and green school livery being unveiled as part of an overall rebrand.

References

External links 
  
 List of Business School

Private schools in Kent
International Baccalaureate schools in England
International schools in England
Educational institutions established in 1952
1952 establishments in England
Schools in Canterbury